The men's 4 × 100 metres relay competition at the 1998 Asian Games in Bangkok, Thailand was held on 15 December at the Thammasat Stadium.

Schedule
All times are Indochina Time (UTC+07:00)

Results
Legend
DNS — Did not start
DSQ — Disqualified

References

External links
Official meet results

Athletics at the 1998 Asian Games
1998